The vice president of Kurdistan Region is the deputy head of the autonomous Kurdistan Region. They are part of the Kurdistan Presidency Council. The vice presidents assist the president in his or her duties and in the president's absence is the acting president.

On 14 June 2005 Masoud Barzani was sworn in by the Kurdistan National Assembly as new president. Kurdistan National Assembly elected Kosrat Rasul Ali as the vice president of the Kurdistan Region.

Vice presidents of Kurdistan Region

See also
President of Kurdistan Region
Prime Minister of Kurdistan Region

References

Government of Kurdistan Region
Politics of Kurdistan Region (Iraq)
Kurdistan
2005 establishments in Iraqi Kurdistan